The 2000 World Single Distance Speed Skating Championships were held between 3 and 5 March 2000 in the M-Wave, Nagano, Japan.

Schedule

Medal summary

Men's events

Women's events

Medal table

References

2000 World Single Distance
World Single Distance Speed Skating Championships
World Single Distance, 2000
Sports competitions in Nagano (city)
World Single Distance Speed Skating Championships